The ninth season of the Romanian reality talent show Vocea României premiered on ProTV on September 6, 2019.Irina Rimes, Tudor Chirilă and Smiley returned as coaches, while Horia Brenciu, who last coached in the third season, returned, replacing Andra. Meanwhile, Pavel Bartoș returned for his ninth season as host.

Auditions

The open call auditions were held in the following locations:

Teams
 Color key

Blind auditions

Color key

Episode 1 (September 6) 
The first episode aired on September 6, 2019. The coaches performed "In the Air Tonight" at the start of the show.

Episode 2 (September 13) 
The second episode aired on September 13, 2019.

Episode 3 (September 20) 
The third episode aired on September 20, 2019.

Episode 4 (September 27) 
The fourth episode aired on September 27, 2019.

Episode 5 (October 4) 
The fifth episode aired on October 4, 2019.

Episode 6 (October 11) 
The sixth episode aired on October 11, 2019.

Episode 7 (October 18) 
The seventh episode aired on October 18, 2019.

Episode 8 (October 25) 
The eighth and last blind audition episode aired on October 25, 2019.

Knockout rounds
The Knockout round started on November 1 after the final blind auditions. The artists from each team were split up into groups of three. At the end of each knockout round the coach then decided out of the three artists who won. The coaches can each steal one losing artist from another team. The top 24 contestants then move on to the Battles round.

Colour key:

Episode 9 (1 November)
The ninth episode aired on November 1, 2019.

Episode 10 (8 November)
The tenth episode aired on November 8, 2019.

Episode 11 (15 November)
The eleventh episode aired on November 15, 2019.

Episode 12 (22 November)
The  twelfth episode aired on November 22, 2019.

The Battles
After the Knockauts, Team Brenciu and Team Smiley and Team Tudor had six contestants, while Team Irina had seven contestants for the Battle rounds. The Battles rounds started with episode 13 on November 29, 2019. Coaches began narrowing down the playing field by training the contestants. Each battle concluding with the respective coach advancing one of the two or three contestants.

Color key:

Episode 13 (29 November)
The thirteenth episode aired on November 29, 2019.

Live shows

Color key:

Week 1 (6 December)
All 12 remaining contestants competed in the first live show on Friday, December 6, 2019. The public vote could save two contestants from each team, the other one was eliminated.

Week 2 - Semi-final (13 December)
All eight remaining contestants performed two songs each in the semi-final on Friday, December 13, 2019: one solo song and a trio with the coach and the other teammate. The public vote could save one contestant from each team, the second one was eliminated.

Week 3 - Final (20 December)
The top 4 contestants performed in the grand final on Friday, December 20, 2019. This week, the four finalists performed a solo song, a duet with a special guest and a duet with their coach. The public vote determined the winner, and that resulted in a victory for Dragoș Moldovan, Tudor Chirilă's fourth victory as a coach.

Elimination chart 
Color key
Artist info

Result details

Overall

Ratings

References

2019 Romanian television seasons